, also spelled Atomic Ro-o-oster on some later CD reissues, is the first album by British rock band Atomic Rooster, with keyboardist Vincent Crane, bassist and vocalist Nick Graham and drummer Carl Palmer.

A few weeks after its release, guitarist and vocalist John Du Cann joined and Nick Graham, the original vocalist and bassist, left. Du Cann subsequently overdubbed three of the album's tracks for a projected US release. However, in the event, the album never saw US release and the overdubbed tracks eventually surfaced on a second pressing of the album in the UK (though with no corrections to the album credits), and subsequent CD reissues.

On the Australian pressing on Interfusion, the rooster's breasts were painted over with feathers on the cover.

The album was reissued on vinyl in 2016.

Track listing

Original UK LP and 2016 reissue
Side One
 "Friday the 13th" (Crane) 3:31
 "And So to Bed" (Crane) 4:09
 "Broken Wings" (John Mayall) 5:47
 "Before Tomorrow" (Crane) 5:52
Side Two
 "Banstead" (Crane, Graham, Palmer) 3:29
 "S.L.Y." (Crane) 4:43
 "Winter" (Crane) 6:53
 "Decline and Fall" (Crane, Graham, Palmer) 5:45
 "Play the Game" (Du Cann) 4:45 - "Tomorrow Night" B-side 1971, bonus track on 1990 CD release
On the 2004 CD reissue of the album, tracks 3 and 4 on the A-side were transposed with tracks 3 and 4 on the B-side.

2004 Castle Music CD reissue
 "Friday the 13th" (Crane) 3:31
 "And So to Bed" (Crane) 4:09
 "Winter" (Crane) 6:53
 "Decline and Fall" (Crane, Graham, Palmer) 5:45
 "Banstead" (Crane, Graham, Palmer) 3:29
 "S.L.Y." (Crane) 4:43
 "Broken Wings" (John Mayall) 5:47
 "Before Tomorrow" (Crane) 5:52
 "Friday the 13th" (Crane) 3:28 - US version: original vocals and piano overdubbed with Du Cann vocals and guitar
 "Before Tomorrow" (Crane) 5:47 - US version: original piano, flute and congas overdubbed with Du Cann guitar
 "S.L.Y." (Crane) 4:53 - US version: original piano overdubbed with Du Cann guitar
 "Friday the 13th" (Crane) 4:28 - BBC Radio Session 1970
 "Seven Lonely Streets" (Du Cann) 6:15 - BBC Radio Session 1970

2006 Akarma Records unlicensed CD reissue bonus tracks
 "Play the Game" (Du Cann) 4:45
 "VUG" (Crane) 4:32 - demo with Carl Palmer 1970
 "Devil's Answer" (Du Cann) 3:59 - demo with Carl Palmer 1970
 "Friday the 13th" (Crane) 4:28 - BBC Radio Session 1970
 "Seven Lonely Streets" (Du Cann) 6:15 - BBC Radio Session 1970

Personnel
Atomic Rooster
 Vincent Crane - Hammond organ, Rhodes piano, backing vocals (tracks 1, 2, 7)
 Nick Graham - bass guitar, lead vocals, flute (tracks 4, 7), guitar (track 6)
 Carl Palmer - drums, percussion, congas (tracks 4, 9), glockenspiel (track 7)

On tracks overdubbed for US release
 John Du Cann - guitar, vocals

References

Bibliography
 The New Musical Express Book of Rock, 1975, Star Books, 

Atomic Rooster albums
1970 debut albums
Albums with cover art by Roger Dean (artist)
Castle Communications albums
B&C Records albums
Repertoire Records albums
Albums produced by Vincent Crane
Albums produced by Carl Palmer
Albums produced by Nick Graham (musician)
Albums produced by John Du Cann
Fontana Records albums